Ambondromifehy is a town and commune in Madagascar.  It is located on the Route nationale 6 between Anivorano Nord and Ambilobe near the Ankarana Reserve.

References and notes 

Populated places in Diana Region